Jiayu County is a county of southeastern Hubei province, People's Republic of China, located on the southeast (right) bank of the Yangtze River.

Administrative divisions
Jiayu County consists of eight towns: Yuyue, Luxi, Gaotieling, Guanqiao, Xinjie, Panjiawan, Dupu, Paizhouwan.

Climate

References

External links
Official website of Jiayu County Government

Counties of Hubei
Xianning